Evangelos "Vangelis" Margaritis (alternate spellings: Evaggelos, Vaggelis) (born December 5, 1982) is a Greek professional basketball player and the team captain for PAOK of the Greek Basket League. He is 6 ft 8 in (2.03 m) tall, and he can play at either the power forward or center positions.

Professional career
Some of the clubs that Margaritis has played with during his career include: Iraklis, Ionikos Nikaias, Peristeri, KAOD, and PAOK. He renewed his contract with PAOK in 2013. In 2015, he eventually became PAOK's team captain. In 2015, he also extended his contract with PAOK, through the 2017–18 season. On June 30, 2021, Margaritis and PAOK amicably parted ways after nine memorable years. On July 6, 2021, Margaritis signed with Kolossos Rodou. In 26 games, he averaged 6.8 points, 4 rebounds, 1.2 assists and 0.9 steals, playing around 19 minutes per contest. On June 16, 2022, Margaritis officially returned to his beloved PAOK.

National team career
Margaritis became a member of the senior men's Greek national basketball team in 2017. He played at the 2019 FIBA World Cup qualification. In his senior national team debut against Great Britain, he scored five points. He also played in the EuroBasket 2021 qualification.

Awards and accomplishments
Greek League All Star: (2018)
2× Greek Second Division Champion: (2009, 2011)

References

External links
EuroCup Profile
Champions League Profile
Eurobasket.com Profile
Greek Basket League Profile 
Greek Basket League Profile 
DraftExpress.com Profile

1982 births
Living people
Centers (basketball)
Greek men's basketball players
Ionikos Nikaias B.C. players
Iraklis Thessaloniki B.C. players
K.A.O.D. B.C. players
Kolossos Rodou B.C. players
P.A.O.K. BC players
Peristeri B.C. players
Power forwards (basketball)
Sportspeople from Katerini